Darby and Joan is a 1920 British drama film directed by Percy Nash and starring Derwent Hall Caine, Leal Douglas, Ivy Close, Meggie Albanesi and George Wynn. The screenplay was written by the novelist Hall Caine and set on the Isle of Man.

Plot
Sir Patrick and Lady Gorry sit by the fireside, and turning the pages of an old album, recall their past life. As a boy Patrick's mother, a widow, kept the mill in a small village in the Isle of Man. Sayle Moore, a large landowner, diverted the mill stream to create an artificial lake in his grounds, robbing the widow of her means of earning a living and bringing poverty to the Gorry's house. Mrs. Gorry and her son Patrick were left nearly destitute and in her heart there grew a great bitterness. She opened a small shop and earned enough for her son's education. One night Mrs. Gorry made her son kneel down and swear vengeance on Sayle Moore. 
Moore had a daughter of whom he was fond. Patrick Gorry and Sheila Moore fell in love. Their parents would not agree to the marriage, particularly as Patrick has to stand trial on a charge of manslaughter, of which he is acquitted. The young couple married without consent and moved to London where Patrick reads for the bar to which he is called. After a long struggle with poverty he rises in his profession, becoming a judge.

Moore came to see Patrick, and wanted to adopt his little son, but the parents would not consent. Later the little boy was accidentally killed by his grandfather's carriage. The years passed on and Patrick was made a Judge. As a Judge he had to try the case of the man who in his early years had victimised the Gorry family. Patrick has the opportunity of securing the acquittal of the youth to whom his daughter is engaged, who like himself, has to stand in the dock to answer a charge of murder. They are only reconciled to their parents at the end of Sayle Moore's life, but have the satisfaction of assisting Mrs. Gorry in her declining years.

Cast
 Derwent Hall Caine - Patrick Gorry
 Ivy Close - Sheila Moore
 George Wynn - Reginald Stevenson
 Meggie Albanesi - Elin Gorry
 Joan Ritz - Lizzie
 Leal Douglas - Mrs Gorry
 Edward O'Neill - Sayle Moore
 Douglas Munro - Malatesta
 Ernest A. Douglas - Joseph Montague
 Edward Craig - David Montagne
 Mary Taviner - Sheila

References

External links

1920 films
Films directed by Percy Nash
1920 drama films
British drama films
British silent feature films
British black-and-white films
1920s English-language films
1920s British films
Silent drama films